State Route 63 (SR 63) is a primary state highway in the U.S. state of Virginia.  The state highway runs  from U.S. Route 58 Alternate (US 58 Alternate) in St. Paul north to SR 80 and SR 83 in Haysi.

Route description

SR 63 begins at an intersection with US 58 Alternate (Bull Run Road) in the town of St. Paul.  The state highway heads east through town as Wise Street, which passes under Norfolk Southern Railway's Clinch Valley District.  The highway intersects SR 270 (4th Street) in the center of town.  SR 63 parallels the Clinch River and CSX's Kingsport Subdivision, formerly the Clinchfield Railroad, east to Lick Creek.  The highway and railroad turn north to follow Lick Creek out of St. Paul and cross the Wise–Russell county line.  The state highway heads north as Dante Road to Dante, where the rail line diverges to pass through the Sandy Ridge Tunnel.  SR 63 crosses Sandy Ridge and the Tennessee Valley Divide at Flint Gap and enters Dickenson County.  SR 63 descends as Dante Mountain Road into the valley of McClure Creek and rejoins the Kingsport Subdivision at Trammel.  The state highway heads northwest through the village of Nora, where McClure Creek merges with Open Fork to become the McClure River.

SR 63 begins to run concurrently with SR 83 (Dickenson Highway) at Fremont; SR 83 heads west toward Clintwood, the county seat of Dickenson County.  The two highways diverge after passing through the town of Clinchco.  SR 83 and the railroad continue to follow the river to Haysi while SR 63 turns onto Big Ridge Road.  The state highway ascends and has a winding path atop Big Ridge.  SR 63 leaves the ridge to descend to the town of Haysi.  The state highway passes over the Kingsport Subdivision at the south end of the railroad's short tunnel and crosses Russell Fork of the Big Sandy River just north of its confluence with the McClure River.  SR 63 turns east and becomes the town's Main Street before the highway reaches its northern terminus in the center of town at its three-way intersection with SR 80 and SR 83, which follow Main Street east and Sandlick Drive south to cross Russell Prater Fork at its confluence with Russell Fork.

Major intersections

References

External links

 Virginia Highways Project: VA 63

063
State Route 063
State Route 063
State Route 063